Abraham Kirimi (born 1358 in Solhat) was a 14th-century Crimean rabbi.

Biography
According to Firkovich ("C. I. H." No. 50), Kirimi was a proselyte and a student of Aaron ben Joseph the Karaite. He derived his name from his native town of Qırım or Solhat (today's Stary Krym), in Crimea.

Kirimi was the author of Sefat Emet (not to be confused with the book of the same name by Rabbi Yehudah Aryeh Leib Alter (1847-1905) of Gora Kalwaria, Poland), a commentary on the Pentateuch, in which he tries to refute the interpretations of the Karaites when they are in contradiction to those of the Rabbinites. Kirimi says in the preface that he wrote the work at the request of many notable Jews and especially of his Karaite pupil Hezekiah b. Elhanan ha-Nasi, whom he held in high esteem.

A part of the preface is in verse, the last two lines of which may be translated:

Moritz Steinschneider and Samuel Joseph Fuenn consider this date to be that of the composition of the work; but it seems rather to be that of the author's birth.

Bibliography of the Jewish Encyclopedia 
 

15th-century converts to Judaism
Karaite rabbis
Medieval Crimea
1358 births
15th-century deaths
Crimean Karaites